The Road to Sampo is a 1975 South Korean film starring Baek Il-seob, Kim Jin-kyu and Mun Suk. The final and posthumous work of director Lee Man-hee, it is adapted from an original short story of the same name by Hwang Sok-yong.

Lee collapsed during the editing phase of the film. He was admitted to a hospital and soon died. According to Baek Kyeol, a screenwriter, Lee's health was already at its worst when he took on the project and may have known that he might not live to see the film's completion.

Plot
With little money left and no work during winter, Roh Young-dal (Baek Il-seob), a young construction worker is at a loss where to go when he meets a middle-aged man named Jeong (Kim Jin-kyu) who is on his way back to his hometown. Jeong gets by doing odd jobs using skills he learned while serving time in prison. After more than ten years' absence, he is homesick and dreams of his hometown, Sampo, where he can fish in the sea and tend his crops.

Young-dal and Jeong meet Baek-hwa (Mun Suk), a runaway waitress at a restaurant in town and the three of them begin their journey together. At first, Young-dal and Baek-hwa argue constantly but soon become attached to each other. As they continue their travel to the train station, each reminisces about his or her past.

At the train station, Young-dal buys Baek-hwa a ticket for her onward journey, hinting at a farewell. He and Jeong then depart for Sampo. After finding a job, Young-dal leaves Jeong. When Jeong finally arrives in Sampo, he is shocked to see how his hometown has changed.

Cast
 Baek Il-seob as Roh Young-dal 
 Kim Jin-kyu as Jeong
 Moon Sook as Baek-hwa
 Kim Ki-bum  
 Kim Yong-hak  
 Sok In-soo  
 Seok Myeong-sun  
 Jang In-han  
 Choe Jae-ho

Awards and nominations

Response

Korean film stamps
In 2009, Korea Post issues The Road to Sampo as part of the third series of Korean film stamps, which also includes Yalkae, a Joker in High School, Never Ever Forget Me and Chilsu and Mansu.

References

External links 
 
 

1975 films
1970s Korean-language films
South Korean drama films
Films directed by Lee Man-hee (director)